Annika Urvikko (born 17 November 1990 in Tampere) is a Finnish artistic gymnast who competed at the 2012 Summer Olympics.

Urvikko began gymnastics in 1997. She joined the junior national team in 2004 and the A-team a year later. Her coaches are the Russian Igor Tšerepov and Riitta Harju-Villamo. Urvikko's choreography is done by Maiju Missokia.

She reached five World Cup podiums, and repeatedly reached the apparatus finals.

Her best European result was 20th in the floor at the 2010 European Championships.  Due to her results at the 2011 World Championships, Urvikko qualified for the 2012 Summer Olympics.  She was the only Finnish gymnast to qualify.  Before Urvikko, the last Finnish gymnast to compete at the Olympics was Mauno Nissinen, who competed at the Munich Olympics 40 years before.  The last Finnish women to compete at the Olympics were Eira Lehtonen and Kaarina Koskinen in 1964.   Urvikko scored 48.815 points in the qualifying round, which is not sufficient to reach the final.

Urvikko has won three gold, one silver and three bronze medals at Nordic Championships. Urvikko won two gold, three silver and one bronze at Northern European Championships. 

Urvikko's great-grandfather, Vihtori Urvikko, was a wrestler who participated the 1912 Summer Olympics in Stockholm.  Her father, Jouko Urvikko, played ice hockey top division at the national level.

References

Finnish female artistic gymnasts
Gymnasts at the 2012 Summer Olympics
Olympic gymnasts of Finland
Gymnasts from Tampere
1990 births
Living people
21st-century Finnish women